Adem Demaçi (26 February 1936 – 26 July 2018) was a Kosovo Albanian politician and writer.

Early life 
Demaçi studied literature, law, and education in Pristina, Belgrade, and Skopje respectively. In the 1950s, he published a number of short stories with pointed social commentary in the magazine Jeta e re (English: New Life), as well as a 1958 novel titled Gjarpijt e gjakut (English: The Snakes of Blood) exploring blood vendettas in Kosovo and Albania. The latter work brought him literary fame. In 1963 he founded the underground organisation the Revolutionary Movement for the Union of Albanians.

Demaçi was first arrested for his opposition to the authoritarian government of Josip Broz Tito in 1958, serving three years in prison. He was again imprisoned 1964–1974 and 1975–1990. In the late 1980s, he was considered one of Yugoslavia‘s most prominent political dissidents.

In 2010 he received the order Hero of Kosovo.

Political career 
After his release, he was Chairman of the Council for the Defense of Human Rights and Freedoms of the People of Kosovo from 1991 to 1995. He also served as editor-in-chief of Zëri, a magazine based in Prishtina, from 1991 to 1993. In 1991, he was awarded the European Parliament's Sakharov Prize for Freedom of Thought.

On March 24, 1993 he went on a hunger strike together with many journalists in defense of free speech and the newspaper "Rilindja"

In 1996, Demaçi moved into politics, replacing Bajram Kosumi as the president of the Parliamentary Party of Kosovo; Kosumi became his vice-president.

Two years later, he joined the Kosovo Liberation Army (KLA), serving as the head of its political wing. In a 1998 interview with The New York Times, he refused to condemn the KLA's use of violence, stating that "the path of nonviolence has gotten us nowhere. People who live under this kind of repression have the right to resist." In 1999, he resigned from the KLA after it attended peace talks in France, criticising the proposed deal for not guaranteeing Kosovo's independence. Sources stated that Demaçi had grown estranged from the KLA's younger, more pragmatic leadership, leaving him "faced with a decision of jumping or waiting to be pushed".

Though Demaçi's wife left Kosovo before the war, he remained in Pristina with his 70-year-old sister during the entire Kosovo War. He was critical of Ibrahim Rugova and other Albanian leaders who fled the conflict, stating that they were missing an important historical event.

Following the war, Demaçi served as director of Kosovo Radio and Television until January 2004. He remained active in politics, affiliated with Albin Kurti, head of the nationalist movement Vetëvendosje!.

Death 
At the age of 82, Demaçi died on 26 July 2018 in Prishtina, Kosovo. His death was marked by three days of national mourning. On 28 July 2018, Demaçi was buried in the cemetery of martyrs in Prishtina, in a state funeral ceremony.

Notes

References

1936 births
2018 deaths
20th-century Albanian politicians
Writers from Pristina
Amnesty International prisoners of conscience held by Yugoslavia
Kosovan prisoners and detainees
Prisoners and detainees of Yugoslavia
Albanian dissidents
Kosovan dissidents
Yugoslav dissidents
Yugoslav people of Albanian descent
Yugoslav prisoners and detainees
Sakharov Prize laureates
Politicians from Pristina